Roseland is an unincorporated area and census-designated place (CDP) in Richland County, Ohio, United States. It was first listed as a CDP prior to the 2020 census.

The CDP is in central Richland County, in northwestern Madison Township. It is bordered to the east, south, and part of the west by the city of Mansfield. Ohio State Route 39 (Springmill Road) runs through the CDP, leading southeast into Mansfield and northwest  to Shelby.

Demographics

References 

Census-designated places in Richland County, Ohio
Census-designated places in Ohio